Goran Knežević (born 12 May 1957) is a Serbian politician and former professional basketball player. His father is Vuksan Knežević (b. 1931), former Yugoslav political dissident and writer who was sent to prison camp Goli Otok at the age of 17. He served as the Minister of Economy of Serbia from 2016 to 2020.

He previously served as Minister of Agriculture, Forestry and Water Management from 2012 to 2013. He also served as the Mayor of Zrenjanin from 2004 to 2009 and shortly in 2012.

Early years and education
He was born in Banatski Karlovac, Serbia. He graduated from the University of Belgrade with a diploma in economics.

Basketball career 
Knežević used to be a basketball player in Partizan from Belgrade, Vojvodina from Novi Sad and Proleter from Zrenjanin. During 1978–79 season he won Yugoslav First Federal League, Yugoslav Cup and FIBA Korać Cup with Partizan.

Also, he used to be a president of Basketball Federation of Serbia and Montenegro during a short period between 2005 and 2006.

Political career
Knežević became mayor of Zrenjanin municipality in 2004, and was re-elected in 2008.

On 1 October 2008 Knežević was interrogated by Serbian police on suspicion that he was involved in "construction mafia" - helping individuals from organized crime circles launder money by investing it in construction and real-estate development.

On 1 April 2009 the D.S. Mayor was charged with Abuse of Office. The Special Prosecution states that the Zrenjanin municipal budget suffered damages to the amount of EUR 1.6mn, as a result.

On 23 April 2009 he was dismissed as a Mayor, since he was in custody since 1 October 2008. He was released from custody on 4 November 2009.

On 11 August 2016, Knežević took the office of the Minister of Economy of Serbia, replacing Željko Sertić on that position.

In February 2017, the Prime Minister of Serbia Aleksandar Vučić decided to run for the 2017 Serbian presidential elections. He won the elections in the first round and was sworn as the President of Serbia on 31 May 2017. Weeks later, he gave mandate to Ana Brnabić to form the governmental cabinet. On 29 June 2017, the cabinet of Ana Brnabić was formed, with Knežević keeping his office.

References

External links
 Official web-site of Goran Knežević (in Serbian language)

1957 births
Living people
Serbian men's basketball players
Serbian basketball executives and administrators
KK Partizan players
KK Vojvodina players
KK Proleter Zrenjanin players
University of Belgrade Faculty of Economics alumni
Government ministers of Serbia
Mayors of places in Serbia
Members of the National Assembly (Serbia)
Yugoslav men's basketball players